Castelfraiano is a Middle Ages castle in Castiglione Messer Marino, Province of Chieti (Abruzzo).

History

Architecture

References

Castefraiano
Castiglione Messer Marino